Ulysses Vincent Conroy Lawrence (born 11 July 1954) is a former cricketer who played first-class and List A cricket for Leeward Islands from 1977 to 1985.

Lawrence was a medium-pace bowler and useful lower-order batsman. He top-scored for Leeward Islands in both of their unsuccessful appearances in the final of the  Geddes Grant/Harrison Line Trophy in 1979-80 and 1983-84. His all-round performances won him the man of the match award twice in the Geddes Grant/Harrison Line Trophy, in 1977-78 and 1983-84.

References

External links
 
 Ulysses Lawrence at CricketArchive

1954 births
Living people
Antigua and Barbuda cricketers
Leeward Islands cricketers
Combined Islands cricketers